NIFTY 500 is India’s first broad-based stock market index of the Indian stock market. It contains top 500 listed companies on the NSE. The NIFTY 500 index represents about 96.1% of free float market capitalization and about 96.5% of the total turnover on the National Stock Exchange (NSE).

NIFTY 500 companies are disaggregated into 72 industry indices. Industry weights in the index reflect industry weights in the market. For example, if the banking sector has a 5% weight in the universe of stocks traded on the NSE, banking stocks in the index would also have an approximate representation of 5% in the index. NIFTY 500 can be used for a variety of purposes such as benchmarking fund portfolios, launching of index funds, ETFs and other structured products.

Record values

Other Notable Indices 
NIFTY 50: Top 50 listed companies on the NSE. A diversified 50 stock index accounting for 13 sectors of the Indian economy.

NIFTY Next 50: Also called NIFTY Juniors. Represents 50 companies from NIFTY 100 after excluding the NIFTY 50 companies.

NIFTY 100: Diversified 100 stock index representing major sectors of the economy. NIFTY 100 represents top 100 companies based on full market capitalization from NIFTY 500.

NIFTY 200: Designed to reflect the behavior and performance of large and mid market capitalization companies.

Index Methodology 
Eligibility Criteria for Selection of Constituent Stocks:

All equity shares listed on the NSE are eligible for inclusion in the NIFTY indices. Convertible stock, bonds, warrants, rights, and preferred stock that provide a guaranteed fixed return are not eligible for inclusion in the NIFTY indices.

To be considered for inclusion in NIFTY 500 index, companies must form part of eligible universe. The eligible universe includes:

i. Companies ranked within top 800 based on both average daily turnover and average daily full market capitalization based on previous six months period data

ii. Companies traded for at least 90% of days during the previous six months period

iii. Securities will be included if rank based on full market capitalization is among top 350

iv. Securities will be included if full market capitalization is 1.50 times of the last constituent in NIFTY 500

v. Securities will be excluded if rank based on full market capitalization falls below 800

vi. Eligibility criteria for newly listed security is checked based on the data for a three-month period instead of a six-month period

Index Re-Balancing: Index is re-balanced on semi-annual basis. The cut-off date is January 31 and July 31 of each year, i.e. For semi-annual review of indices, average data for six months ending the cut-off date is considered. Four weeks prior notice is given to market from the date of change.

Index Governance: A professional team manages all NSE indices. There is a three-tier governance structure comprising the Board of Directors of NSE Indices Limited, the Index Advisory Committee (Equity) and the Index Maintenance Sub-Committee.

References

See also
 NIFTY 50
 BSE SENSEX

S&P Dow Jones Indices
Year of establishment missing
National Stock Exchange of India
Indian stock market indices